Exeter City Council is the local authority for Exeter in Devon, England. One third of the council is elected each year, followed by one year without election.

Political control
Since the first election to the council in 1973 following the reforms of the Local Government Act 1972, political control of the council has been held by the following parties:

Leadership
The role of Lord Mayor of Exeter is largely ceremonial. Political leadership is provided by the leader of the council. The leaders since 1983 have been:

Council elections
1973 Exeter City Council election
1976 Exeter City Council election
1979 Exeter City Council election
1983 Exeter City Council election (New ward boundaries)
1984 Exeter City Council election
1986 Exeter City Council election
1987 Exeter City Council election
1988 Exeter City Council election (City boundary changes took place but the number of seats remained the same)
1990 Exeter City Council election
1991 Exeter City Council election
1992 Exeter City Council election
1994 Exeter City Council election
1995 Exeter City Council election
1996 Exeter City Council election
1998 Exeter City Council election
1999 Exeter City Council election
2000 Exeter City Council election (New ward boundaries)
2002 Exeter City Council election
2003 Exeter City Council election
2004 Exeter City Council election
2006 Exeter City Council election
2007 Exeter City Council election
2008 Exeter City Council election
2010 Exeter City Council election (By-elections in 12 wards were held in September following a High Court ruling) 
2011 Exeter City Council election
2012 Exeter City Council election
2014 Exeter City Council election
2015 Exeter City Council election
2016 Exeter City Council election (New ward boundaries)
2018 Exeter City Council election
2019 Exeter City Council election
2021 Exeter City Council election
2022 Exeter City Council election

Result maps

By-election results

0

References

External links
Exeter City Council

 
Council elections in Devon
District council elections in England
Elections in Exeter